The constitution of Northern Cyprus protects the freedom of religion, and it states that Northern Cyprus is a secular state. The US Department of State report in 2002 stated that religious freedom was protected by law in Northern Cyprus and the government generally respected the freedom of religion. The freedom of religion report in 2007 by US Department of State also stated that "Turkish Cypriot authorities generally respected this right in practice" and the practice of religion was generally free. In 2009, Minority Rights Group International also reported that Turkish Cypriot authorities respected religious freedom in general.

Anglican churches 
There are two Anglican churches is Northern Cyprus.  They are:
 St Andrew's Church in Kyrenia
 St Mark's Church in Famagusta visit:

Orthodox Christianity 
In 2010, the US Department of State reported that "Greek Cypriot Orthodox and Maronite Catholics were allowed to perform religious services on a regular basis, without prior permission."

On 28 September 2010, Resolution 1631, was approved by the U.S. House of Representatives:
"... calling for the protection of religious sites and artifacts from and in Turkish-occupied areas of northern Cyprus as well as for general respect for religious freedom."

The Turkish Foreign Ministry responded with a press released statement, saying that the resolution had "many factual errors which may harm the credibility of the House of Representatives".

On 27 January 2011, the Parliamentary Assembly of the Council of Europe, in written declaration no. 467, condemned the alleged interruption of the Christmas mass in Northern Cyprus by Turkish troops and restrictions to the right to freedom of religion and worship. The declaration claimed that Turkish troops forced the priest conducting the service to remove his vestments and ordered everybody to leave the church, thus violating the European Convention on Human Rights.

On 18 March 2011, 204 Greek school books, including religious books, that were being taken to the schools at Rizokarpaso were confiscated by Turkish Cypriot customs officers at the Pergamos village barricade. The Turkish Cypriot daily newspaper Afrika, in a front page article, criticised those who claim that there is freedom of religion in Northern Cyprus when the religious books were confiscated.

Church service restriction controversy
On 20 May 2016, Northern Cypriot Foreign Minister Tahsin Ertuğruloğlu restricted Greek Orthodox communities to only hold a single religious service per year, with the exceptions of the Apostolos Andreas Monastery in Rizokarpaso, the Monastery of St. Barnabas in Famagusta and St. Mamas' Church in Morphou. The remaining churches could be used for one of the following three feasts: the church's Name Day, Easter or Christmas. Undersecretary Mustafa Lakadamyalı claimed that the move was to prevent the "abuse" of the permission to hold masses, also citing difficulties with the policing of more than one mass a day or frequent masses. Lakadamyalı also said that "whilst some TRNC citizens can pass to the south even for worship, some absolutely cannot". No restriction was placed on Maronites.

The decision was harshly criticized by Turkish Cypriot group Famagusta Initiative as "chauvinist and intolerant" and it was pointed out that no problem was encountered in the masses which took place in, for example, the Nestorian Church in Famagusta. Ertuğruloğlu's decision was also criticized by Burak Mavis of the Turkish Cypriot Teachers’ Trade Union (KTOS) who called out the whole debate as being driven by "a backwards and racist political mentality," but it was defended by Yilmaz Bora, the leader of the Association of the Ex-Servicemen of the Turkish Resistance Organisation, who was cited as saying "it was not possible to live with the Greek Cypriots in a United Cyprus, because the mentality of the Greek Cypriots has not changed in 53 years."

Judaism
There is a synagogue for the Jewish community in Northern Cyprus in Kyrenia.

References

Freedom of religion
Human rights in Northern Cyprus